Parkgate United F.C. was an English association football club based in Parkgate, Rotherham, South Yorkshire.

History
The club was formed in the early 1880s as Rawmarsh & Parkgate. They finished as runners-up in the 1895 Hatchard League and shared the Sheffield Association League title in 1899 with Worksop Town. They first entered the FA Cup in 1896.

Honours

League
Sheffield Association League
Champions: 1897–98, 1898–99 (shared)
Hatchard League
Runners-up: 1894–95

Cup

Records
Best FA Cup performance: 3rd Qualifying Round, 1897–98

References

Defunct football clubs in England
Defunct football clubs in South Yorkshire
Hatchard League
Sheffield Association League
Association football clubs established in the 19th century